Sebastian Hilli (born 20 May 1990 in Helsinki) is a Finnish composer. Hilli studied composition at the Sibelius Academy and at the University of Music and Performing Arts Vienna with Lauri Kilpiö, Michael Jarrell and Veli-Matti Puumala. Hilli's works are published exclusively by Schott Music.

Hilli's first orchestral work Reachings won the International Toru Takemitsu Composition Award in Tokyo in 2015 and was the selected work in the "composers under 30" category in the 64th International Rostrum of Composers in Palermo, Italy in 2017. Hilli is the winner of the Gaudeamus Award 2018. Hilli's orchestral work Snap Music was awarded the Teosto Prize in 2019.

Hilli's works have been performed for example by BBC National Orchestra of Wales, Tokyo Philharmonic Orchestra, Finnish Radio Symphony Orchestra, Helsinki Philharmonic Orchestra and by musicians such as Ryan Bancroft, Hannu Lintu, Jukka-Pekka Saraste, André de Ridder, Nicolas Hodges, Olari Elts and Bas Wiegers. Hilli's largest work so far is 45-minute-long Affekt, premiered by Helsinki Philharmonic Orchestra, a 250-member choir and conducted by Leif Segerstam in 2017.

References 

Sibelius Academy alumni
University of Music and Performing Arts Vienna alumni
Gaudeamus Composition Competition prize-winners
1990 births
Living people
Musicians from Helsinki
21st-century Finnish composers